The Bigamist is a 1921 British silent romance film directed by Guy Newall and starring Newall, Ivy Duke, and Julian Royce.

Plot
As described in a film magazine, Pamela (Duke) and Herbert Arnott (Royce) have been happily married for five years and have had two children. On the day of their wedding anniversary, Pamela receives a letter from another woman signed Lucy Arnott which states that she is the legal wife of Herbert. Herbert confirms that this is the truth and explains that Lucy refused to give him a divorce. For the sake of their children, Pamela continues to live with Herbert, but their governess Blanche (Everest) later overhears a conversation between them and learns the truth regarding the status of the marriage. Pamela discharges Blanche, and on the day the governess leaves Herbert also departs. Pamela calls on family friend George Dane for advice. George agrees to search for Herbert, and by tracing the governess locates Herbert in a hospital. He is ill but has a message disclosing that Lucy Arnott has died. Pamela and Herbert are then remarried by the hospital priest. There is also a subplot about the Carruthers, another couple who are friends of the Arnotts, where Constance Carruthers (Scott) desires to have babies but her husband Richard (Davenport) is more interested in golf.

Cast
 Guy Newall as George Dane 
 Ivy Duke as Pamela Arnott 
 Julian Royce as Herbert Arnott 
 Barbara Everest as Blanche Maitland 
 A. Bromley as Richard Carruthers 
 Dorothy Scott as Constance Carruthers 
 Douglas Munro as Proprietor

References

Bibliography
 Bamford, Kentom. Distorted Images: British National Identity and Film in the 1920s. I.B. Tauris, 1999.
 Low, Rachael. History of the British Film, 1918-1929. George Allen & Unwin, 1971.

External links
 

1921 films
British black-and-white films
1920s romance films
British romance films
British silent feature films
Films directed by Guy Newall
Films based on British novels
Films set in England
1920s English-language films
1920s British films